Americana/Folk Albums (formerly Folk Albums) is a music chart published weekly by Billboard magazine which ranks the top selling "current releases by traditional folk artists, as well as appropriate titles by acoustic-based singer-songwriters" in the United States.  The chart debuted on the issue dated December 5, 2009, as a 15-position chart with its first number-one title being the Bob Dylan Christmas album Christmas in the Heart.

It has since expanded to a 25-position chart. In May 2016, Billboard renamed the chart to "Americana/Folk Albums", with the increasing popularity of Americana music, giving more recognition to acts which lean more towards Americana than folk.

List of number-one albums
These are the albums which have reached number one on the folk albums chart listed in chronological order. Note that Billboard publishes charts with an issue date approximately 3 days in advance.

References

External links
 

Americana Folk Albums 2020s
United States Americana Folk Albums